Bishop Consolidated Independent School District is a public school district based in the town of Bishop, in Nueces County, Texas (USA).  In addition to Bishop, the district also serves the city of Petronila, a small section of Tierra Grande, and a small section of La Paloma-Lost Creek.

Finances
As of the 2010–2011 school year, the appraised valuation of property in the district was $462,993,000. The maintenance tax rate was $0.104 and the bond tax rate was $0.052 per $100 of appraised valuation.

Academic achievement
In 2011, the school district was rated "recognized" by the Texas Education Agency.

Schools
In the 2011–2012 school year, the district opened six schools.

Regular instructional
Bishop High School (Grades 9-12)
Lillion E. Luehrs Junior High (Grades 7-8)
Bishop Elementary (Grades 4-6)
Petronila Elementary (Grades PK-5)
Bishop Primary (Grades PK-3)

Alternative instructional
Nueces County JJAEP (Grades 6-12)

See also

List of school districts in Texas

References

External links
 

School districts in Nueces County, Texas